Kailash (Kacee) Vasudeva is an Indian-born Canadian businessman.  He has designed products ranging from automotive products and tools, power tool accessories, mosquito and bed bug prevention, and eco-friendly packaging.

Early life and move to Canada

Born to mother, Kaushalya Devi Vasudeva, and father, Uttam Chand Vasudeva, on 6 October 1945. He graduated from the Indo Swiss Training Center in Chandigarh, India, and worked as an engineer in the Mahle Piston division at Escorts.

Vasudeva immigrated to Canada in September 1971 and gained experience in various industries. He started Maxi-Flow from his garage in 1977.  He also founded Mastercut Industries Inc in 1979, now known as Maxtech Consumer Products, whose specialty is designing and manufacturing hand tools and power tool accessories sold in Canada, the United States, Mexico, the United Kingdom and Germany.

Career 

Vasudeva has been a board member for the Automotive Parts Manufacturers' Association since 2001.

Vasudeva was a member of Team Canada, where he accompanied former Prime Minister Jean Chrétien on a trade mission to Asia in January 1997. During Prime Minister Justin Trudeau's visit to India in February, 2018, Vasudeva again was part of the delegation.

Vasudeva received Canadian Aboriginal & Minority Suppliers Council's 2020 Business Achievement Award in Special Recognition Category on behalf of Maxtech.

Vasudeva was named Outstanding Business Leader in 1998 by Wilfrid Laurier University.

Vasudeva was named Businessman of the Year by the Indo-Canada Chamber of Commerce (ICCC) in 1997.

References

External links 

 The Record Article: Local bosses earn spot in finals for provincial business award; Waterloo's Maxtech, Guelph's Ranger Metals in running.  26 July 2000

Living people
Businesspeople of Indian descent
Canadian inventors
Canadian people of Indian descent
Year of birth missing (living people)